Scarlet Records is an Italian independent record label based in Milan. It is most notable for featuring two side projects from Soilwork front-man Björn "Speed" Strid, as well as bands like Agent Steel, Royal Hunt, Skyclad, Eldritch, Hatesphere, Labyrinth, Dark Moor, DGM and more. Founded in 1998, Scarlet Records has released more than 400 albums. In 2011 Scarlet Records entered a distribution deal with Entertainment One Distribution for the North American distribution of its new releases and extensive physical and digital catalog. In 2021 become a limited company.

Current artists

 Apostolica
 Atlas Pain
 Band Of Spice
 Be The Wolf
 Cellador
 Cryonic Temple
 Darktribe
 Deathless Legacy
 Eagleheart
 Eldritch
 Excalion
 Faithsedge
 Fellowship
 Frozen Crown
 Furor Gallico
 Game Over
 Hatesphere
 Horned Almighty
 Lahmia
 Light & Shade
 My Regime
 National Suicide
 Necrodeath
 Nocturna
 Noveria
 Reasons Behind
 Sadist
 Sinheresy
 Skeletoon
 Stormlord
 Theatres des Vampires
 Trick Or Treat
 Ulvedharr
 Vandor
 Verikalpa
 Vexillum
 Vision Divine
 Volturian
 Whyzdom

Former bands

 Aborym
 Agent Steel
 Arachnes
 Arthemis
 Barcode
 Blinded Colony
 Bloodshot
 Bokor
 Brick
 Bulldozer
 Cadaveria
 Dark Moor
 DGM
 Disarmonia Mundi
 Dotma
 Dragonhammer
 Empyrios
 Extrema
 Holy Knights
 Infinita Symphonia
 Invocator
 Kaledon
 Kingcrow
 Labyrinth
 Malfeitor
 Manticora
 Mastercastle
 Metatrone
 Michele Luppi
 Node
 Odd Dimension
 Operatika
 Sawthis
 Scamp
 Odyssea
 Requiem
 Revolution Renaissance
 Royal Hunt
 Schizo
 Shaman
 Secret Sphere
 Scar of the Sun
 Skylark
 Skyclad
 Slowmotion Apocalypse
 Solar Fragment
 SmaXone
 Spice & The RJ Band
 Subzero
 Temperance
 Tigertailz
 Timo Tolkki
 Tears of Magdalena
 Terror 2000
 Thy Majestie
 Tyrant Eyes
 Wuthering Heights

See also
 List of record labels

References

External links
 

Italian independent record labels
Heavy metal record labels
Death metal record labels